The 1916 Grand National was cancelled because Aintree Racecourse was taken over by the War Office. However, a substitute race known as the Racecourse Association Steeple Chase was held at Gatwick Racecourse. The Gatwick races from 1916 to 1918 are not typically included in the true Grand National record books.

The race was won by Vermouth, ridden by jockey Jack Reardon and trained by James Bell.

Finishing Order

Non-finishers

References

http://www.grand-national.net/gatwick.htm

 1916
Grand National
Grand National
20th century in Sussex